Aleksandar Popović (born May 13, 1957) is a retired sprinter who represented Yugoslavia at the 1980 Summer Olympics in the men's 200 meters. He ran in the quarterfinals. Popović was a member of Partizan athletics club.

References

External links
 Sports Reference

1957 births
Living people
Serbian male sprinters
Athletes (track and field) at the 1980 Summer Olympics
Olympic athletes of Yugoslavia
Athletes from Belgrade
Yugoslav male sprinters
Yugoslav male hurdlers
Serbian male hurdlers
Mediterranean Games bronze medalists for Yugoslavia
Mediterranean Games medalists in athletics
Athletes (track and field) at the 1979 Mediterranean Games